Karl Leitner (born 26 November 1937) is an Austrian sprint canoer who competed in the early 1960s. At the 1960 Summer Olympics in Rome, he was eliminated in the repechages of the K-1 4 × 500 m event.

References
Sports-reference.com profile

External links

1937 births
Austrian male canoeists
Canoeists at the 1960 Summer Olympics
Living people
Olympic canoeists of Austria
Place of birth missing (living people)